Caladenia fulva, commonly known as the tawny spider orchid, is a plant in the orchid family Orchidaceae and is endemic to a small area in Victoria. It is a ground orchid with a single hairy leaf and one or two creamy-white to pale yellow flowers. Only two small populations are known, although both are in nature reserves.

Description
Caladenia fulva is a terrestrial, perennial, deciduous, herb with a small, spherical underground tuber. The sepals and petals taper to thin, blackish, thread-like tips and sometimes have red stripes. There are four or six rows of foot-shaped, reddish calli along the centre line of the labellum. Flowering occurs from September to October.

Taxonomy and naming
Caladenia fulva was first formally described by Geoffrey Carr in 1991 from a specimen collected near Stawell. The description was published in Indigenous Flora and Fauna Association Miscellaneous Paper 1. The specific epithet (fulva) is a Latin word meaning “tawny” or "reddish-yellow".

Distribution and habitat
The tawny spider orchid is only known from woodland near Stawell where it grows in well-drained soil.

Conservation
Caladenia fulva is listed as  "endangered" under the Victorian Government Flora and Fauna Guarantee Act 1988 and the Australian Government Environment Protection and Biodiversity Conservation Act 1999. Only two populations totalling an estimated 650 plants in 2010 are known. The main threats to the species are its small population size, habitat loss and disturbance, and weed invasion. Both populations are in nature reserves.

References

fulva
Plants described in 1991
Endemic orchids of Australia
Orchids of Victoria (Australia)